Hawaii Route 30, also known as the Honoapi'ilani Highway, is a   road on West Maui, Hawaii. It begins in downtown Wailuku, extending south through Waikapu and Maalaea.

Following terrain of the island, the highway circumvents the West Maui Forest Reserve connecting Olowalu, Launiupoko, Lahaina, Kahana, through the regions of Kapalua and Honolua, and ending in Honokohau Bay. At this point the road continues as the Kahekili Highway, a "notoriously narrow and twisty" county-maintained road covering the northern coastline of West Maui and eventually terminating back in Wailuku. The eastern part of Kahekili Highway is signed as Hawaii Route 340. The two highways together, plus a short stretch of Hawaii Route 32, complete the circular journey around West Maui.

Major intersections

Related route

Hawaii Route 3000, also known as the Lahaina Bypass, is a highway that bypasses the town of Lahaina. The Section 2 of the highway opened on December 17, 2013. Hawaii DOT plans call for a much longer bypass to be constructed in the near future, with the possibility of moving the Route 30 designation to the bypass highway. 

Phase 1B-2 of Lahaina Bypass, which starts at the southeastern termini of the previous bypass phase (Lahaina Bypass 1B-1) at Hokiokio Road and continues approximately 2.7 miles to the southeast to the proposed southern	 terminus at the Honoapiilani Highway (State Route 30), opened to the public on April 23rd, 2018.

Gallery

References

External links

Transportation in Maui County, Hawaii
0030